African Americans are a demographic minority in the United States. African-Americans' initial achievements in various fields historically establish a foothold, providing a precedent for more widespread cultural change. The shorthand phrase for this is "breaking the color barrier."

In addition to major national- and international-level firsts, African-Americans have achieved firsts on a statewide basis.

19th century

1832
First governor of African descent in what is now the US: Pío Pico, an Afro-Mexican, was the last governor of Alta California before it was ceded to the US. Like all Californios, Pico automatically became a US citizen in 1848. He was elected to the Los Angeles Common Council in 1853, but he did not assume office.

1868
First elected African-American lieutenant governor: Oscar Dunn, Lieutenant Governor of Louisiana
 First 33 African-American legislators in Georgia: see Original 33

1870
May: First African-American acting governor: Oscar James Dunn of Louisiana from May until August 9, 1871, when sitting Governor Warmoth was incapacitated and chose to recuperate in Mississippi. (see also: Douglas Wilder, 1990)

1872
First African-American governor of Louisiana: P. B. S. Pinchback (Also first in U.S.) (non-elected; see also Douglas Wilder, 1990)

1873
First African-American Speaker of the Mississippi House of Representatives, and of any state legislature: John R. Lynch
First African American elected to the Tennessee General Assembly: Sampson W. Keeble

1876
First African American elected to the Illinois General Assembly: John W. E. Thomas

1879
First African American elected to the Wyoming Legislature: William Jefferson Hardin

1880
First African-American elected to the Indiana general assembly: James Sidney Hinton

1889
First African-American female principal in Massachusetts and the Northeast: Maria Louise Baldwin, supervising white faculty and a predominantly white student body at the Agassiz Grammar School in Cambridge (renamed the Maria L. Baldwin School in 2004).

1893
First African-American member elected to the Michigan House of Representatives: William Webb Ferguson

1898
First African-American member elected to the Minnesota House of Representatives: John Francis Wheaton

20th century

1917
First African American to enter the University of Oregon: Mabel Byrd

1918
First African-American elected to political office in California: Frederick Madison Roberts, California State Assembly

1920
First African-American elected to the Missouri legislature: Walthall Moore

1924
First African-American elected to the Illinois Senate: Adelbert Roberts

1930
First African Americans elected as judges in the state of New York: James S. Watson and Charles E. Toney{{Judicial Friends Association. (n.d.). Heroic beginnings - judicial friends association. Retrieved January 26, 2023, from https://judicialfriends.org/heroic-beginnings/https://judicialfriends.org/heroic-beginnings}

1938
 First African-American woman to be elected to the Pennsylvania General Assembly and to any state legislature: Crystal Bird Fauset

1939
 First African-American woman to own a cosmetology school in Iowa: Pauline Brown Humphrey

1950
 First African-American woman to be elected to the West Virginia Legislature: Elizabeth Simpson Drewry
 First African-American woman to be elected to the Michigan Legislature: Charline White

1952
First African American to graduate from the University of Arkansas for Medical Sciences: Edith Irby Jones

1955
 First African-American woman elected to the New York State Legislature: Bessie A. Buchanan
 First African-American elected to the Maryland State Senate: Harry A. Cole

1956
First African-American student to attend the University of Alabama: Autherine Lucy Her expulsion from the institution later that year led to the university's President Oliver Carmichael's resignation.
First African American to teach at college or university level in California: Betty Smith Williams.

1957
 First African-American woman elected to the New Jersey Legislature: Madaline A. Williams

1958
 First African-American women elected to the Maryland General Assembly: Verda F. Welcome and Irma George Dixon
 First African-American woman elected to the Illinois General Assembly: Floy Clements
First African American to graduate from the University of Maryland: Elaine J. Coates

1959
First African American to graduate from the University of Maryland: Elaine J. Coates

1962
First African-American attorney general of Massachusetts: Edward Brooke. Also first African American to hold Massachusetts statewide office, and first African-American attorney general of any state.

1964
First African-American woman elected to the Indiana Legislature: Daisy Riley Lloyd
 First African-American woman elected to the New York State Senate: Constance Baker Motley

1966
First African-American woman elected to the Texas Legislature: Barbara Jordan
First African American known lesbian state legislator: Barbara Jordan
First African-American woman elected to the Georgia General Assembly: Grace Towns Hamilton
First African-American appointed to New York State Board of Regents: Kenneth Bancroft Clark
First African-American senator from Massachusetts: Edward Brooke. (Also first post-Reconstruction African American elected to the U.S. Senate and first African American elected to the U.S. Senate by popular vote).
 First African-American woman in the California Legislature: Yvonne Brathwaite Burke
 First African-American woman elected to the Tennessee General Assembly: Dorothy Lavinia Brown
 First African-American woman elected to the Arizona Legislature: Ethel Maynard

1967
First African-American woman admitted to the Mississippi Bar: Marian Wright Edelman
 First African-American woman elected to the Montana Legislature: Geraldine W. Travis

1969
First African-American elected mayor of a Mississippi city since Reconstruction: Charles Evers, in Fayette, Mississippi

1970
 First African-Americans elected to the Alaska Legislature: Willard L. Bowman and Joshua Wright
 First African-American woman elected to the Florida Legislature: Gwen Cherry

1971
First African-American woman elected to the Washington Legislature: Peggy Maxie

1973
 First African-American woman elected to the Massachusetts General Court: Doris Bunte
 First African-American woman elected to the Connecticut General Assembly: Margaret E. Morton

1974
 First African-American woman elected to the Michigan State Board of Education: Barbara Roberts Mason

1975
 First African-American woman elected to the South Carolina Legislature: Juanita Goggins

1976
First African-American appointed as a judge in Federal District Court in Virginia: Robert H. Cooley III (1939–1998), appointed to the Eastern District
First African-American elected mayor in New Mexico: Albert Johnson
 First African-American mayor in New Mexico: Albert Johnson
1977
First African-American to serve on the California Supreme Court: Wiley W. Manuel
First African-American speaker of the South Carolina House of Representatives, and of any state legislature in the United States since Reconstruction: K. Leroy Irvis
 First African-American woman elected to the Wisconsin Legislature: Marcia P. Coggs
 First African-American woman elected to the Illinois Senate: Earlean Collins

1978
 First African-American appointed to the office of Michigan State Treasurer: Loren E. Monroe
 First African-American woman elected to the Ohio Legislature: Helen Rankin

1979
First African-American elected to a statewide office in Illinois: Roland Burris, office of Comptroller
First African-American elected to a statewide office in Wisconsin: Vel Phillips, office of Secretary of State

1980
First African-American speaker of the California State Assembly: Willie Lewis Brown Jr.

1981
 First African-American woman elected to the Arkansas General Assembly: Irma Hunter Brown
 First African-American elected to the Utah Senate: Terry Williams

1984
First African-American elected to a statewide office in Georgia: Robert Benham, Supreme Court of Georgia
 First African-American woman to be elected to the Virginia General Assembly: Yvonne B. Miller

1985
 First African-American woman to be elected to the Mississippi Legislature: Alyce Clarke
 First African-American woman elected to the Oregon Legislature: Margaret Carter

1987
 First African-American justice of the Connecticut Supreme Court: Robert D. Glass
1988
 First African-American elected to the Wyoming Legislature: Harriet Elizabeth Byrd

1990
First African-American governor of Virginia: Douglas Wilder (also first elected governor in US; see also P. B. S. Pinchback, 1872)
 First African-American woman elected to the Alaska Legislature: Bettye Davis

1992
First African-American elected to a statewide office in Indiana: Pamela Carter, office of Attorney General
First African-American Minnesota Supreme Court justice: Alan Page

1993
First African-American senator from Illinois: Carol Moseley Braun. (Also first African-American woman elected to the United States Senate, the first African-American U.S. Senator for the Democratic Party, the first woman to defeat an incumbent U.S. Senator in an election, and the first female Senator from Illinois).

 1994
 First African-American woman elected to the Nevada Legislature: Bernice Mathews

 1996
 First African-American woman elected to the Oregon Legislature: Avel Gordly

1998
First African-American woman elected State Treasurer and first African-American woman elected statewide in Connecticut: Denise Nappier

First African-American elected to office of Attorney General Georgia: Thurbert E. Baker

21st century

2001
First African-American woman elected to the Minnesota Legislature: Neva Walker

2002
First African-American lieutenant governor of Maryland and first elected to statewide office in Maryland: Michael Steele (see also: 2009)
2004
First African-American  District Attorney in California: Kamala Harris (San Francisco) (see also: 2010, 2017) 
First African-American Oklahoma Supreme Court justice: Tom Colbert
First African-American Wisconsin Supreme Court justice: Louis B. Butler
First African-American Auditor of Accounts of Vermont and first elected to statewide office in Vermont: Randy Brock
First African-American congresswoman elected in Wisconsin's history: Gwen Moore

2006
First African-American elected governor of Massachusetts: Deval Patrick
First African-American lieutenant governor of New York: David Paterson

2008
First African-American woman elected Speaker of the California State Assembly: Karen Bass
First African-American governor of New York State: David Paterson (elected as lieutenant governor, succeeded on resignation of previous governor)
First African-American women elected to the Nebraska Legislature: Tanya Cook and Brenda Council

2009
First bicameral state legislature to have both chambers headed simultaneously by African Americans: Peter Groff and Terrance Carroll of Colorado.

2010
First African-American elected Attorney General of California: Kamala Harris (see also: 2004, 2017)
First African-American Chief Justice of the Massachusetts Supreme Judicial Court: Roderick L. Ireland
First African-American elected to the Idaho Legislature: Cherie Buckner-Webb

2012
First African-American elected to the Idaho Senate: Cherie Buckner-Webb

2013
First African-American senator from South Carolina: Tim Scott (Also the first African-American to serve both houses of the U.S. Congress.)
 First African-American woman to be appointed to a seat on the New York Court of Appeals: Sheila Abdus-Salaam.
 First African-American senator from New Jersey: Cory Booker

2014
First African-American senator elected from the South since Reconstruction: Tim Scott

2015
First African-American elected Speaker of the New York State Assembly: Carl Heastie
First African-American Lieutenant Governor of Kentucky and first elected to statewide office in Kentucky: Jenean Hampton
First African-American woman elected to the Utah Legislature: Sandra Hollins

2017
First African-American United States Senator from California: Kamala Harris (see also: 2004, 2010)
First African-American elected lieutenant governor of New Jersey: Sheila Oliver
First African-American out trans woman to be elected to public office in the United States: Andrea Jenkins

2018
First female African-American major-party candidate for governor: Stacey Abrams, Georgia
First African-American elected Lieutenant Governor of Michigan: Garlin Gilchrist
First African-American Attorney General of New York: Letitia James
First African-American and First woman elected Speaker of the Maryland House of Delegates: Adrienne A. Jones
First African-American elected Lieutenant Governor of Illinois: Juliana Stratton
2019
First African-American elected Attorney General of Kentucky: Daniel Cameron
First Surgeon General for the State of California: Nadine Burke Harris
2020

First African-American congresswoman elected in Missouri's history: Cori Bush
First African-American elected Lieutenant Governor of North Carolina: Mark Robinson

2021

First African-American senator from Georgia and first African-American Democratic Senator from the South: Raphael Warnock
First African-American woman to serve on the Supreme Court of Missouri: Robin Ransom
First African-American woman elected Lieutenant Governor of Virginia: Winsome Sears
First African-American woman to serve as Secretary of the State of Connecticut: Natalie Braswell

2022
First African-American elected Attorney General of Maryland: Anthony Brown
First African-American woman elected Attorney General of Massachusetts: Andrea Campbell
First African-American elected Lieutenant Governor of Pennsylvania: Austin Davis
First African-American congresswoman elected in Pennsylvania's history: Summer Lee
First African-American elected governor of Maryland: Wes Moore
First African-American elected Speaker of the Michigan House of Representatives: Joe Tate
First African-American woman elected Secretary of State of Connecticut: Stephanie Thomas 
First African-American elected Secretary of State of California: Shirley Weber 

2023
First African-American woman elected Speaker of the Pennsylvania House of Representatives: Joanna McClinton

See also
List of first African American mayors

References

African-American
1, State
United States history timelines